Sir Humphrey Forster (died 1602) was an English MP and High Sheriff.

Humphrey Forster may also refer to:

Humphrey Forster (died 1555), High Sheriff of Berkshire and Oxfordshire
Sir Humphrey Forster, 1st Baronet (1595–1663), of the Forster baronets, High Sheriff of Berkshire
Sir Humphrey Forster, 2nd Baronet (1649–1711), of the Forster baronets, High Sheriff of Berkshire, MP for Berkshire

See also
Forster (surname)